(long title: To amend the Fish and Wildlife Act of 1956 to reauthorize the volunteer programs and community partnerships for the benefit of national wildlife refuges, and for other purpose) is a bill that was introduced into the United States House of Representatives during the 113th United States Congress.  The bill would "extend through FY2017 the authorization of appropriations for volunteer services for programs conducted by the United States Fish and Wildlife Service or the National Oceanic and Atmospheric Administration (NOAA), community partnership projects for national wildlife refuges, and refuge education programs."  The bill would authorize the appropriation of $6 million between 2015-2017.

Provisions of the bill
This summary is based largely on the summary provided by the Congressional Research Service, a public domain source.

H.R. 1300 would amend the Fish and Wildlife Act of 1956 to extend through FY2017 the authorization of appropriations for volunteer services for programs conducted by the United States Fish and Wildlife Service or the National Oceanic and Atmospheric Administration (NOAA), community partnership projects for national wildlife refuges, and refuge education programs.

Congressional Budget office report

H.R. 1300 would authorize the appropriation of $6 million over the 2015-2017 period for the U.S. Fish and Wildlife Service to carry out volunteer programs and community partnerships at national wildlife refuges. Assuming appropriation of the authorized amounts, the Congressional Budget Office (CBO) estimates that implementing the legislation would cost $6 million over the 2015-2017 period. Enacting H.R. 1300 would not affect direct spending or revenues; therefore, pay-as-you-go procedures do not apply.

Procedural history
H.R. 1300 was introduced into the House on March 20, 2013 by Rep. Jon Runyan (R-NJ).  It was referred to the United States House Committee on Natural Resources and the United States House Natural Resources Subcommittee on Fisheries, Wildlife, Oceans and Insular Affairs.  Subcommittee hearings were held on April 25, 2013.  The bill was reported (amended) on June 17, 2013 alongside House Report 113-112.  On Friday, July 19, 2013, House Majority Leader Eric Cantor announced that H.R. 1300 would be on the schedule for Monday, July 22, 2013.  H.R. 1300 was considered under a suspension of the rules.

See also
List of bills in the 113th United States Congress
United States Fish and Wildlife Service
Fish and Wildlife Act
National Oceanic and Atmospheric Administration

Notes/References

External links

Library of Congress - Thomas H.R. 1300
beta.congress.gov H.R. 1300
GovTrack.us H.R. 1300
OpenCongress.org H.R. 1300
WashingtonWatch.com H.R. 1300
Testimony from the Department of the Interior on H.R. 1300
House Republicans' Legislative Digest on H.R. 1300
House Report 113-112 on H.R. 1300

Proposed legislation of the 113th United States Congress
National Oceanic and Atmospheric Administration
United States Fish and Wildlife Service